Million Dollar Racket is a 1937 American film starring Herman Brix.

References

External links
Million Dollar Racket at IMDb
Million Dollar Racket at TCMDB

1937 films
American crime drama films
1937 crime drama films
American black-and-white films
1930s American films